Manker is a surname. Notable people with the surname include:

 David Manker Abshire (1926–2014), American politician
 Ernst Manker (1893–1972), Swedish ethnographer
 Paulus Manker (born 1958), Austrian film director and actor
 Tina Manker (born 1989), German rower